is a Japanese footballer currently playing as a defender for Blaublitz Akita. Kato was born in Edogawa, Tokyo on 18 October 1999. He began playing football competitively at age 3 and had belonged to the local junior youth team at Mitsubishi Yowa. After graduating from Senshu University, he joined J2 League club Blaublitz Akita in 2022. In April, he debuted against Fagiano Okayama as a substitute centre-back.

Career statistics

Club
.

Notes

References

External links

1999 births
Living people
Japanese footballers
Association football defenders
Senshu University alumni
J2 League players
J3 League players
Blaublitz Akita players
Vanraure Hachinohe players